Josef Mathauser (24 July 1846 in Staňkov – 10 January 1917 in Prague) was a Czech painter.

Work
Mathauser is known for his religious paintings, and for his series of "History of the Czech Nation in Pictures".

Among his religious works are the Stations of the Cross in the Church of the Assumption of the Virgin Mary in Mariánské Lázně (1886–1887) and an altar in the Church of Saints Peter and Paul, and the restoration of religious scenes at Svatá Hora Monastery in Příbram (1895).

He is buried at Vinohrady Cemetery in Prague.

References

1846 births
1917 deaths
Czech painters
Czech illustrators
People from Domažlice District